Outreau is a commune in the Pas-de-Calais department in the Hauts-de-France region of France.

Geography
Outreau is a large industrial town and port situated adjacent to, and west of Boulogne, on the N1, N142 and D19 roads. The river Liane forms the eastern border of the commune with Boulogne.

History
The town suffered greatly from Allied bombing during World War II.
Outreau is notorious throughout France for the Outreau trials of 2001–2004.

Population

Places of interest
 The church of St. Wandrille, dating from the nineteenth century.
 The sixteenth century manorhouse of La Tour du Renard.
 The Commonwealth War Graves Commission cemetery.
 The war memorial, by Augustin Lesieux.

Geographic location

Twin towns
  Eppelborn, Germany.

See also
Communes of the Pas-de-Calais department

References

External links

 Official town website 
 Website with photos of Outreau 
 The CWGC cemetery
 Outreau  on the Quid website 
 Website of the Communauté d'Agglomération de Boulogne-Côte-d'Opale 

Communes of Pas-de-Calais